Rieman Block is a historic commercial building located at Baltimore, Maryland, United States. It is a Queen Anne-style terraced brick commercial and residential block of three stories plus a mansard roof in height, built about 1880. The shop fronts date from the late 19th and early 20th centuries. It is named for Joseph Rieman (1822-1898), a real estate developer and member of the boards of several corporations.

Rieman Block was listed on the National Register of Historic Places in 1984.

References

External links
, including photo from about 1950, at Maryland Historical Trust

Buildings and structures in Baltimore
Commercial buildings on the National Register of Historic Places in Baltimore
Commercial buildings completed in 1880
Downtown Baltimore
Queen Anne architecture in Maryland
1880 establishments in Maryland